"The Learning (Burn)" is the first single from Mobb Deep's fifth album Infamy. The song features Big Noyd and Vita.

Background

Prodigy's verse contains a subliminal diss towards Jay-Z, in response to the song Takeover.

Music video

The music video was directed by Diane Martel & features a cameo by DJ Kay Slay. Although Vita is on the chorus of the song, she does not appear in the music video for the song due to Mobb Deep's beef with Jay-Z (who had a strong relationship with her record label Murder Inc Records).

Charts

Track listing
Side A
"Burn" [Clean version]

Side B
"Burn" [Dirty version]
"Burn" [Instrumental]

References

2001 songs
Mobb Deep songs
Song recordings produced by Havoc (musician)
Songs written by Havoc (musician)
Songs written by Prodigy (rapper)
Gangsta rap songs